Horacio Pagani (born 10 November 1955) is an Argentine-Italian businessman and engineer in the automotive industry. He is the founder of Pagani Automobili S.p.A., an Italian specialty auto-maker.

Prior to founding his own company, Pagani worked for Renault and Lamborghini.

Personal life
Horacio Pagani was born in Casilda, Argentina to Luca and Maria Pagani. His father, Luca, was a baker from Italy.

Career
Pagani took an interest in engineering while still living in Argentina. However, he felt from the beginning that the rural town into which he was born was inadequate for fulfilling his dream of an engineering career. He opened a small shop where he worked at a very young age, gaining valuable experience in craftsmanship. By the age of 20, Pagani had designed and built his first F3 racer.

The turning point in Pagani's life came when he was hired by Renault to improve the body of a racing car. His work offered staggering improvements and Pagani was able to showcase his talent. After having success on this small scale, Pagani visited Lamborghini and met with the company's chief technical director Giulio Alfieri. In 1982, he decided to move to Italy and he was hired by Lamborghini. Pagani began working basic jobs such as sweeping the floors, however he was able to work his way up the company.

He became the chief engineer at Lamborghini and he built the Countach Evoluzione concept. He tried to persuade Lamborghini to buy an autoclave so they could extend the production of the carbon parts for the Evoluzione. They refused, saying that Ferrari did not have an autoclave, so Lamborghini didn't need to have one. Pagani borrowed the capital to buy his own autoclave late in 1987 and then, in 1991, he broke away from the company and founded his own consultancy called Modena Design which continues to make carbon fiber composites for Formula One cars and clients like Daimler, Ferrari and Aprilia.

Pagani Automobili Modena was founded by Pagani in 1992. The first car he produced was the Zonda, which took seven years to complete, followed by the Huayra, named after Huayra-tata, the god of the wind in Incan culture.

References

Bibliography
 Morelli, Roberto, and Hugo Racca (2010). "Pagani, the Story of a Dream." Italy: Edizioni Arteimmagine. .
 Interviews and commentaries by Gian Paolo Dallara, Valentino Balboni, and Gordon Murray.

External links
Horacio Pagani biography (in Spanish)

 1955 births
 Argentine inventors
 Argentine emigrants to Italy
 Argentine people of Italian descent
 Italian automotive engineers
 Italian automotive pioneers
 Italian founders of automobile manufacturers
 Lamborghini people
 Living people
 National University of La Plata alumni
 Pagani (company)
 People from Casilda
Compasso d'Oro Award recipients